Hazel M. Johnson (January 25, 1935 – January 12, 2011) was an environmental activist on the South Side of Chicago, Illinois. She is considered to be the mother of environmental justice.

Biography
Johnson was born in New Orleans, Louisiana, on January 25, 1935, to Mary (née Dunmore) and Clarence Washington. Orphaned when she was 12 years old, she was sent to live with an aunt in Los Angeles. She attended Jefferson High School for two years, then returned to New Orleans to live with her grandmother. She met John Johnson there a few months later and in 1955, they moved with their two children to Woodlawn, Chicago. While raising a family Johnson worked a number of jobs including recruiting members to an African American neighborhood association, sorting mail for the U.S. Postal Service, and working as an administrative support for Parents and Friends of Retarded Children.

The Johnsons moved to Altgeld Gardens Homes, a South Side, Chicago housing project managed by the Chicago Housing Authority, in 1962. Originally built to house American war veterans, the area was by surrounded landfills, industrial buildings and sewage-treatment plants. Following the death of her husband in 1969 from lung cancer and the prevalence of skin and respiratory issues among her seven children, Johnson began investigating the impacts of the neighborhood's environmental conditions on its residents. She documented the occurrence of chronic health problems present in the community in order to better understand the impacts of the area's air and water pollution. What Johnson learned led her to dub the neighborhood "The Toxic Donut". In addition to being exposed to hazardous fumes from surrounding factories and asbestos used during construction of the buildings, the community was supplied with contaminated drinking water and was found to have the highest cancer rate in the city.

Following the death of her husband, Johnson's growing awareness about the impacts of environmental hazards on people's health prompted her to begin agitating for accountability from the Chicago Housing Authority regarding their failure to properly maintain buildings and ignoring environmental hazards. She ran for and was elected to the Altgeld Gardens Local Advisory Council in 1970, remaining in the role until 1979 before founding the People for Community Recovery. For her efforts Johnson has been recognized as the mother of the environmental justice movement.

People for Community Recovery
In 1979 Johnson founded the People for Community Recovery. Incorporated as a not-for-profit organization in 1982, the group focused "on fighting environmental racism as it affected the residents of Altgeld Gardens public housing project." One of their first achievements was successfully lobbying the city of Chicago to test the well-sourced drinking water supplied to Maryland Manor, which demonstrated the presence of toxins, cyanide among them, in the community's water. The 1984 findings resulted in the introduction of water and sewer lines to the area.

The People for Community Recovery, which continues to operate today under the leadership of Johnson's daughter Cheryl, went on to conduct multiple surveys documenting the South Side's "abnormally high rates of respiratory, pulmonary, and skin-related disease in addition to high infant death rates and cancer." Records regarding their activities spanning from 1935 to 2007 were donated to the Chicago Public Library for public use in 2009.

Death
Johnson died of complications related to congestive heart failure on January 12, 2011.

Personal life 
Johnson was Catholic.

Legacy
Johnson was given the 1992 President's Environment and Conservation Challenge award in recognition of her environmental justice work. In 2004 sociologist David Naguib Pellow credited Johnson and the People for Community Recovery with putting "the South Side of Chicago on the radar screen for activists and policy makers around the United States who are concerned about environmental racism." Of her work Johnson explained: "It's all very well to embrace saving the rain forests and conserving endangered animal species, but such global initiatives don't even begin to impact communities inhabited by people of color."

On January 12, 2011, the Illinois General Assembly, by way of a house joint resolution, designated "the portion of 130th Street from the Bishop Ford Freeway to State Street in Chicago as the "Hazel Johnson EJ Way". The naming of the stretch was officially celebrated during a ribbon cutting ceremony  on September 15, 2016.

References

External links

 (official website)

1935 births
2011 deaths
American environmentalists
American women environmentalists
Activists from New Orleans
African-American Catholics
Activists from Chicago
Catholics from Louisiana
Catholics from Illinois
African-American activists
20th-century African-American women
20th-century African-American people
21st-century American women
21st-century African-American women
21st-century African-American people
Roman Catholic activists